The 2006–07 season was the 97th year of football played by Dundee United, and covers the period from 1 July 2006 to 30 June 2007. United finished in ninth place for the third season in the row and meant they had only finished in the top six once in the seven seasons since the split was introduced.

United finished the season in 9th place with 42 points in the 2006–07 SPL season. In a poor end to the post-match split, United failed to win, scoring just one goal.

The League Cup campaign was ended by St Johnstone – aided by ex-United player Jason Scotland – who won 3–0 in the third round. United also exited the Scottish Cup at the second hurdle, losing 1–0 at Inverness CT in the 4th round.

Fans' favourite Craig Brewster left the manager's position in late-October, with former Hearts and Leicester City manager Craig Levein taking up the post.

Review and events
United signed Craig Conway, Noel Hunt and Steven Robb in pre-season, with Derek McInnes, Jim McIntyre and Grant Brebner departing on free transfers after being released by the club. United started pre-season with a 4–1 win at Raith Rovers before a week in Denmark with matches against Herfølge BK and FC Nordsjælland. Back in Scotland, United played Forfar at Station Park before the Evening Telegraph Challenge Cup resulted in a disappointing 1–0 defeat to rivals Dundee at Dens. The round of pre-season friendlies meant none were played at Tannadice.

United started the league campaign with a 2–1 loss to Falkirk at home on the opening day of the season and then drew at Rangers, despite being 2–0 ahead. Goals from new signings Noel Hunt and Christian Kalvenes had put United ahead but Rangers fought back to draw in Paul Le Guen's first home match as Rangers manager. David Proctor finally arrived from Inverness CT to end weeks of protracted negotiations. Successive 0–0 draws against Kilmarnock (where Lee Miller's only start was marred by an early sending-off) and Dunfermline were improved by an extra-time CIS Cup win over Airdrie United and a 3–1 win at newly promoted St Mirren, where captain Barry Robson's 100th United match was event-filled, with two goals and a sending-off. The transfer window brought no new faces but striker Lee Miller was surprisingly allowed to leave for Aberdeen on a free transfer, although it later transpired he had been disciplined days earlier for breaking club regulations. David Fernández and Paul Ritchie were also freed before the deadline, with Fernandez signing for Kilmarnock and Ritchie joining Cypriot side Omonia Nicosia.

United started September with a 3–0 defeat at home to Hibernian but their unbeaten away run continued in Inverness with a 0–0 draw against Caley Thistle. United crashed out of the CIS Cup with a 3–0 defeat away to St Johnstone, with ex-United player Jason Scotland scoring the first goal. Further woe followed with only a draw at home to bottom-placed Motherwell. Free agent Grant Smith was recruited in late September to provide goals from midfield.

October started with a 4–0 defeat to Hearts at Tynecastle and a 4–1 home defeat to Celtic, sending United to the bottom of the table. In-between these matches, former Dundee defender Lee Wilkie signed until the end of the season. a 3–1 defeat to Aberdeen at Pittodrie led Brewster to publicly admit his players were in danger of heading for the First Division
 and the following 5–1 defeat to Falkirk did little to change this viewpoint. The low point of the season represented Brewster's final attempt to turn things around, illustrated by handing debut starts to no fewer than four players. United lost all four games in October, conceding 16 goals in the process.

On 29 October, Brewster and assistant Malky Thomson left by "mutual agreement", with widely tipped Craig Levein appointed less than 24 hours later. Levein's first match, a televised Sunday affair at home to Rangers, was watched from the stand as he completed a touchline ban from his time at Raith; it made little difference, as United came from behind to win 2–1 and record their first home league win of the season. The following weekend, Levein matched Brewster's record of two league wins, doing so in just two matches with a 1–0 win over Kilmarnock (Noel Hunt scoring). Mark de Vries – who played under Levein at Hearts and Leicester City – made public his desire to play for United. Levein's third match in charge brought a disappointing late 2–1 defeat at Dunfermline but November finished with three home wins in a row with a 1–0 win over St Mirren. Three wins from four was enough to hand Levein a Manager of the Month award in his first month (something also achieved by Gordon Chisholm in April 2006 during his caretaker spell).

December started with a battling 2–1 defeat at Hibs but a fourth consecutive home win followed with a 3–1 victory over Inverness. In-between these games, Cowdenbeath midfielder Morgaro Gomis agreed a deal to join in the transfer window for a nominal fee. On 15 December, defenders Ross Gardiner and Lee Wilkie agreed one-month loan deals with Arbroath and Ross County respectively. United won 3–2 at Motherwell, despite having defender Christian Kalvenes sent off in the first half. A narrow 1–0 defeat to Hearts ended Levein's impressive home form but plaudits were gained again following a 2–2 draw away to Celtic, although for the second time this season, United threw away a two-goal lead away to the Old Firm. 2006 ended on a high with a 3–1 win over 2nd-placed Aberdeen.

If 2006 ended on a high, then 2007 could not have begun any worse – a second 5–1 defeat to Falkirk, this time at Tannadice. New signing Morgaro Gomis made a late debut with Irishman Jon Daly becoming Levein's next signing, the big target man arriving from Hartlepool United on 5 January. The following day, Levein confirmed Grant Smith's contract would not be renewed but Sean Dillon's move from Shelbourne was eventually completed, with the Irish full back arriving on 11 January. Prior to this, a flu epidemic had seen the Scottish Cup game against St Mirren postponed. The after-effects may have been present as United slumped to a 5–0 defeat at Ibrox, with Daly and Dillon both making debuts. Shortly afterwards, it was announced that Inverness captain Darren Dods had signed a pre-contract agreement to join in the summer, ending a lengthy pursuit for him that had been started by former manager Craig Brewster some months previously. The re-arranged cup match against St Mirren was full of excitement, with United throwing away a two-goal lead before David Robertson secured the win with an injury-time winner. United lost a third consecutive league match, going down 1–0 at Rugby Park, with David McCracken – who had earlier been told he would be leaving in the summer – absent. Shortly afterwards, Alan Archibald and David Proctor were also informed they were free to leave. January's final match resulted in a disappointing goalless draw at home to Dunfermline.

Alan Archibald left to rejoin Partick Thistle on deadline day, while Che Bunce – who had spent a few days at Tannadice on trial – opted to sign for Coventry City instead. United exited the Scottish Cup, losing 1–0 to Inverness. David Proctor became the second player to move with special FIFA dispensation to a third club of the season (after Javier Mascherano), moving on loan to Airdrie United. On the pitch, United finally picked up a league win in 2007, completing a fourth successive victory over St Mirren this season, courtesy of Barry Robson's strike. The following week saw another clean sheet with a 0–0 draw at home to Hibs, only for a last-minute goal to give Inverness a 1–0 win up north. Off the pitch, there was plenty of excitement with a rumoured summer friendly against Barcelona, although the excitement failed to materialise onto the pitch as United were held 1–1 at home to Motherwell. The following weekend, Craig Levein's return to Tynecastle brought much cheer with a resounding 4–0 win, including Barry Robson's first senior hat-trick. United closed out March with a credible 1–1 draw at home to Celtic, although Barry Robson's second red card of the season spoiled Jon Daly's first goal for the club.

April began in emphatic fashion, with a 4–2 win at Aberdeen which saw five goals in the opening seventeen minutes; Greg Cameron's first goals for United were enough to clinch victory. United entered the league split with an away match at Dunfermline and continued their winless streak that stretched back to 1997, losing 1–0. The following week, David Robertson's goal earned a 1–1 draw at home to Inverness, although it later transpired Jon Daly's knee injury was posterior cruciate ligament damage and would rule him out for several months. On the same day, United's proposed pre-season fixture with Barcelona was confirmed, before St Mirren eased their relegation worries with a 2–0 weekend win at Tannadice. The penultimate match of the season saw a third straight loss for United, going down 2–0 at Falkirk; earlier in the week, Derek Stillie confirmed he would leave the club at the end of the season to pursue an English law career. Collin Samuel was not far behind, although due to the club deciding not to offer a new contract. The Falkirk defeat also saw another début for a youngster with Johnny Russell making a late substitute appearance. The season finished with a 0–0 home draw against Motherwell. It was the final game for Derek Stillie, David McCracken, Lee Mair and Collin Samuel, who each started the match.

Match results
Dundee United played a total of 42 competitive matches during the 2006–07 season, as well as five pre-season friendlies, making a total of nearly fifty games played. The team finished ninth in the Scottish Premier League.

In the cup competitions, United were knocked out of the Scottish Cup at the fourth round stage, losing 1–0 at Inverness CT. The club also exited early in the League Cup, losing 3–0 away to First Division side St Johnstone in the third round.

Legend

All results are written with Dundee United's score first.

Bank of Scotland Premierleague

Scottish Cup

CIS Cup

Player details
During the 2006–07 season, United used 29 different players, with a further three named as substitutes who did not make an appearance on the pitch. The table below shows the number of appearances and goals scored by each player.

|}

Goalscorers
Twelve players scored for the United first team with the team scoring 44 goals in total. The top goalscorer was Barry Robson, who finished the season with 12 goals.

Discipline
During the 2006–07 season, five United players were sent off, and twenty players received at least one yellow card. In total, the team received seven dismissals and 70 cautions.

Team statistics

League table

Transfers

In
Nine players were signed during the 2006–07 season, with a total (public) transfer cost of just under £100,000, although three transfers were undisclosed or nominal fees.

The players that joined Dundee United during the 2006–07 season, along with their previous club, are listed below.

Sean Dillon's fee was €20,000, which amounted to approximately £13,500 at the time of transfer

Out
No players were loaned out during the 2006–07 season, with twelve leaving the club permanently. The club received no transfer fees as all players were released.

Listed below are the players that were released during the season, along with the club that they joined. Players did not necessarily join their next club immediately.

Playing kit

The strips were produced for the first time by Hummel and the jerseys were sponsored for the first time by Anglian Home Improvements (who also sponsored Motherwell in the same season). For the first time, the shorts were sponsored (by Ole International).

Awards
 Craig Levein
 Bank of Scotland Premierleague Manager of the Month: 2
 November 2006, March 2007

See also
 2006–07 Scottish Premier League
 2006–07 Scottish Cup
 2006–07 Scottish League Cup
 2006–07 in Scottish football

References

External links
 Official site: 2006/07 Results
 BBC – Club stats
 Soccerbase – Results | Squad stats | Transfers

2006-07
Scottish football clubs 2006–07 season